Lachenalia contaminata (wild hyacinth) is a species of flowering plant in the family Asparagaceae, native to the Western Cape of South Africa.

The Latin specific epithet contaminata refers to the flowers which appear to be "contaminated" with red or brown markings.

This plant requires a sheltered, frost-free position or under glass.

References

External links
 

contaminata
Flora of the Cape Provinces